Luzviminda Fernandez (July 13, 1935 – March 5, 2022), better known professionally as Luz Fernandez, was a Filipino actress and television presenter. She was a long-time radio actress for DZRH who also did acting for film, television, and theater.

Career

Radio
Fernandez first received public attention as a radio actress for Metropolitan Broadcasting Company (MBC; now Manila Broadcasting Company). Fernandez spent her entire radio career working for MBC's station, DZRH which she joined in the 1950s. Her stay with DZRH lasted for 64 years. She frequently did radio work with Augusto Victa and Tiya Dely. Fernandez often did work for radio dramas was frequently cast in antagonistic roles although her most noted role was "Lola Basyang", a caring grandmother character who teaches children morals. Fernandez did work for around 30 radio dramas for DZRH. In 2009, she was honored with the "Best Actress of All Time" title by DZRH on its 70th anniversary.

Television and film
Fernandez also did acting roles for television and feature films. Among her noted roles was as Lola Torya in the 1980s children's fantasy series Ora Engkantada which originally aired by IBC and as the villain fairy Luka in the fantasy-sitcom series Okay Ka, Fairy Ko!. She would also appear in Pepito Manaloto, Kambal, Karibal, and Amaya.

One of her earlier films was Rodrigo de Villa a co-production between LVN Pictures and Indonesian studio Pesari released in 1952. Her last film was And Ai, Thank You!. The 2019 film which starred Ai-Ai delas Alas was her last appearance in film and television.

Theater
Fernandez also did acting for theater. She have done 13 Plays of Wilfrido Ma. Guerrero. She would also reprise her role as Lola Basyang, which she earlier did for radio, in Ballet Manila's version of Severino Reyes' Tatlong Kuwento ni Lola Basyang in 2015.

Death
Fernandez died of cardiac arrest at a hospital in Marikina, on March 5, 2022, at the age of 86.

Filmography

Television

Feature films

References

External links

Basyang role not new to Luz

1935 births
2022 deaths
Filipino film actresses
Radio actresses
Filipino stage actresses
Filipino television actresses